San Miguel de Abona is a town and a municipality in the southern part of the island of Tenerife, one of the Canary Islands, and part of the province of Santa Cruz de Tenerife, Spain. The TF-1 motorway passes through the southern part of the municipality.

The population is 16,099 (2013), its area is 42.04 km2.

In the south of the municipality, on the coastline, lies the golf course and holiday/residential village of Golf del Sur. Also on the coast is Amarilla Golf & Country Club. Golf del Sur has hosted several professional golf tournaments including the Tenerife Open, the Tenerife Ladies Open.

Historical population

References

External links

Coalición Canaria San Miguel de Abona
Hotel Rural San Miguel de Abona

WEBCAM LIVE COSTA SAN MIGUEL,AMARILLA GOLF 

Municipalities in Tenerife